Guo Yunfei (born June 28, 1991) is a female Chinese Taekwondo practitioner.

References

External links
 
 

1991 births
Living people
Chinese female taekwondo practitioners
Asian Games medalists in taekwondo
Taekwondo practitioners at the 2010 Asian Games
Taekwondo practitioners at the 2014 Asian Games
Asian Games gold medalists for China
Medalists at the 2010 Asian Games
Medalists at the 2014 Asian Games
Universiade medalists in taekwondo
Universiade gold medalists for China
World Taekwondo Championships medalists
Medalists at the 2011 Summer Universiade
Medalists at the 2015 Summer Universiade
21st-century Chinese women